West African University Benin (WAUB) is a private university located in Cotonou, Republic of Benin. It was established in 2014, having been registered by the Ministry of Higher Education, Republic of Benin. , it has some 50 on-campus students from Nigeria and Benin, as well as some 400 distance learning students in Nigeria running various programmes.

External links

Academia in Benin
Cotonou
Educational institutions established in 2014
Universities in Benin
2014 establishments in Benin